Khamis Al-Subhi (born 1954) is an Omani sports shooter. He competed in the men's 10 metre air rifle event at the 1984 Summer Olympics. Al-Subhi finished in 48th place out of 54 competitors, earning 552 points.

References

1954 births
Living people
Omani male sport shooters
Olympic shooters of Oman
Shooters at the 1984 Summer Olympics
Place of birth missing (living people)
Shooters at the 1994 Asian Games
Asian Games competitors for Oman
20th-century Omani people